"Remember The Roses" is a short story by Avery Taylor. It is a mixture of  mystery, love, and horror. It was set during the Second World War and originally published in England in 1967 by a British publisher. Later it was published in India by Frank Bros. & Co. in a story book A Treasure Trove of Short Stories.

Plot
During the Second World War, Robert, an English agent, comes to rescue Paul Renard, a key member of the French Resistance, who has been taken by the Gestapo and is being held in a prison in Rouen, France. Robert parachutes into a field near Rouen. When he tries to make a contact with a member of the Resistance who lives at 16 Rue de Derriere, Robert is almost captured by the Nazis. A young girl called Jehane le Brun rescues him and helps him to locate and free Renard. When Robert returns to England, no one believes his account of how he returned with Renard. When they all inspect the evidence, Robert finds that Jehane could have been none other than the legendary Maid of Orléans, Joan of Arc, who had fought for France in 1429.

Author
Avery Taylor is a British author. In 1973, six years after the original publication of "Remember The Roses" in England she married and, in 1982, settled permanently in Australia. Her latest book, Twist of Fate, is available on Amazon. Many of her other novels, both in Kindle and paperback, are also available.

References

British short stories
1967 short stories